The Twin Bridges Championship is an annual golf tournament for professional women golfers on the Epson Tour, the LPGA's developmental tour. The event has been played since 1984 and is held in the Albany, New York area.

In 2010 and 2011, the title sponsor was Price Chopper, a chain of supermarkets headquartered in Schenectady, New York. The presenting sponsors in 2012 were SEFCU and Sunmark, credit unions in the Albany area, and Burns-Fazzi, Brock, a credit union benefits consulting company. SEFCU became title sponsor in 2014 and in 2015 Fuccillo Kia with Billy Fuccillo stepped in. In 2019 Capital District Physicians' Health Plan, Inc. (CDPHP) became title sponsor. The venue changed to Pinehaven Country Club and the tournament purse rose to $175,000 in 2021. 

The tournament was a 54-hole event, as are most Symetra Tour tournaments, and includes pre-tournament pro-am opportunities, in which local amateur golfers can play with the professional golfers from the Tour as a benefit for local charities.  

Tournament names through the years: 
2000–2002: Capital Region Futures Classic
2003: GE Futures Professional Golf Classic
2004–2005: The Albany Futures Golf Classic
2006–2009: ILOVENY Championship
2010–2011: Price Chopper Tour Championship
2012: The Credit Union Challenge presented by SEFCU, Sunmark, and BFB Benefits
2013: Credit Union Challenge
2014: SEFCU Championship at Capital Hills
2015–2016: Fuccillo Kia Championship at Capital Hills
2017–2018: Fuccillo Kia Classic of NY
2019–2020: The CDPHP Open
2021: Twin Bridges Championship

Winners

Tournament records

References

External links

Coverage on Epson Tour website
Capital Hills at Albany official website
Western Turnpike Golf Course official website
Orchard Creek Golf Club official website

Symetra Tour events
Golf in New York (state)
Sports in Albany, New York
Recurring sporting events established in 1984